Alfred Gard (1876 – after 1900) was an English professional footballer who played in the Football League for Small Heath.

Gard was born in Reading, Berkshire. He played for Trowbridge Town before joining Small Heath in July 1900 as cover for the injury-prone Billy Bennett. During the 1900–01 season, Bennett was injured rather less than usual, so it was not until 16 February 1901 that Gard eventually made his Second Division debut, in a 3–1 home win against Barnsley. He deputised twice more for Bennett, but moved on to Southern League club Maidenhead at the end of the season.

References

1876 births
Year of death missing
Sportspeople from Reading, Berkshire
English footballers
Association football wingers
Trowbridge Town F.C. players
Birmingham City F.C. players
Maidenhead United F.C. players
English Football League players
Date of birth missing
Place of death missing
Footballers from Berkshire